Big Brother 2015 is the twelfth season of German reality series Big Brother. The show began on 22 September 2015, after the last season was on 2011. The show now airs on sixx and is hosted by Jochen Bendel. 

In this season, housemates competed in pairs. On Day 29 the teams were mixed and so each housemate got a new teammate, except for Christian who now had the 'power' to decide. On Day 43 each male housemate decided which female housemate should be in their teams. On Day 57 the housemates decided which housemate should become the first finalist. After a tie between Christian, Lusy and Thomas the public decided that Lusy became the first finalist with 55% of the votes. The final was aired on the 22 December 2015. Lusy was announced as the winner with Sharon being the runner-up. She is only the fourth woman to be crowned as the winner.

Housemates

Nominations table

External links 
 

12
2015 German television seasons